is the 45th single by Japanese entertainer Akina Nakamori. Written by Takashi Matsumoto and Kenji Hayashida, the single was released on December 7, 2005, by Universal Sigma. It was also the lead single from her compilation album Best Finger 25th Anniversary Selection.

Background 
"Rakka Ryūsui" was released a year and five months after Nakamori's previous single "Hajimete Deatta Hi no Yō ni". It was used as the theme song of the TV Tokyo drama special . The B-side is a re-recording of Nakamori's 1986 hit single "Desire (Jōnetsu)".

Chart performance 
"Rakka Ryūsui" peaked at No. 43 on Oricon's weekly singles chart and sold over 5,000 copies.

Track listing

Charts

References

External links 
 
 
 

2005 singles
2005 songs
Akina Nakamori songs
Japanese-language songs
Japanese television drama theme songs
Songs with lyrics by Takashi Matsumoto (lyricist)
Universal Sigma singles